A Letter to a Friend (written 1656; published posthumously in 1690), by Sir Thomas Browne, the 17th century philosopher and physician, is a medical treatise of case-histories and witty speculations upon the human condition.

Morgellons
It is believed to be the source of a term Mary Leitao found in 2001 to describe her son's skin condition. She chose the name "Morgellons disease" from a skin condition described by Browne in Letter to a Friend, thus:

There is, however, no suggestion that the symptoms described by Browne are linked to the alleged modern cases of Morgellons.

In 1935, Charles Ernest Kellett MD FRCP (1903-1978), who lectured in the history of medicine at the University of Newcastle medical school, wrote a detailed criticism of Browne's Morgellons reference.

References

External links

Full text with comments

1656 books
1690 books
Works by Thomas Browne
Books published posthumously
Treatises
Medical books
Delusional parasitosis